Gadirov (Azerbaijani: Qədirov, Russian: Гадиров) is an Azerbaijani masculine surname; its feminine counterpart is Gadirova. The surname may refer to the following notable people: 
Farda Gadirov, the perpetrator of the Azerbaijan State Oil Academy shooting in 2009
Jennifer Gadirova (born 2004), British artistic gymnast
Jessica Gadirova (born 2004), British artistic gymnast, twin sister of Jennifer

Azerbaijani-language surnames